Junsele IF is a Swedish football club located in Junsele in Sollefteå Municipality, Västernorrland County.

Background
Junsele Idrottsförening is a sports club from Junsele that was founded in 1908. The club specialises in the sports of football, cross country skiing, alpine skiing, tennis, fitness and ice hockey.

Since their foundation Junsele IF has participated mainly in the middle and lower divisions of the Swedish football league system.  In the 2010 season the club finished top of Division 3 Mellersta Norrland, which is the fifth tier of Swedish football, and have won promotion to Division 2 for the first time. They play their home matches at the Mons IP in Junsele.

Junsele IF are affiliated to the Ångermanlands Fotbollförbund.

Season to season

Attendances

In recent seasons Junsele IF have had the following average attendances:

The attendance record for Junsele IF was around 1,400 spectators for the match against Ådalslidens SK in 1961 (Division 4 Ångermanland).

Footnotes

External links
 Junsele IF – Official website

Sport in Västernorrland County
Football clubs in Västernorrland County
Association football clubs established in 1908
1908 establishments in Sweden